Haner may refer to:
 Old Mandarin
 Or HaNer, a kibbutzim of Shaar HaNegev Regional Council, Israel

People with the surname Haner include:
 Brian Haner, American guitarist
 Brian Haner, Jr., better known as Synyster Gates, lead guitarist for Avenged Sevenfold
 Georg Haner, German Lutheran theologist (see German Wikipedia)